Eremaea ebracteata is a plant in the myrtle family, Myrtaceae and is endemic to the south-west of Western Australia. It is a shrub with narrow, mostly linear leaves and which bears orange-coloured flowers on the long branches of the same season's growth.  The fruits have a surface that is rough and lumpy.

Description
(The two varieties differ mainly in leaf size and shape.)

The flowers are orange and are on the ends of long branches which grew earlier in the same season. The flowers occur singly, rarely two or three together. The stamens are arranged in 5 bundles, each containing 40 to 60 stamens. Flowering occurs from November to December and is followed by fruits which are woody capsules.
[[File:Eremaea ebracteata closeup.jpg|thumb|225px|Foliage of Eremaea ebractata]]

Taxonomy and namingEremaea ebracteata was first formally described in 1860 by Ferdinand von Mueller in Fragmenta Phytographiae Australiae. The specific epithet (ebracteata) is from the Latin prefix e meaning "without" and bracteatus meaning "gilt".

There are two varieties:

Distribution and habitatEremaea ebracteata is found in the Irwin district although var. ebracteata generally occurs in more northern parts of the range. It grows in sand or sandy loam on sandplains.

Conservation
Both varieties of Eremaea ebracteata'' are classified as "not threatened" by the Western Australian Government Department of Parks and Wildlife.

References

ebracteata
Myrtales of Australia
Plants described in 1860
Endemic flora of Western Australia
Taxa named by Ferdinand von Mueller